Poland is scheduled to compete at the 2019 European Games, in Minsk, Belarus from 21 to 30 June 2019. Poland has previously competed at the 2015 European Games in Baku, Azerbaijan, where it won 20 medals, including two golds. With Kraków as the host city of the 2023 European Games, the Polish segment is expected to be performed at the closing ceremony.

Medalists

| width="78%" align="left" valign="top" |

Archery

Recurve

Compound

Athletics

Roster
Urszula Bhebhe
Karolina Bołdysz
Dominika Dabulis
Angelika Faka
Mariola Karaś
Marta Kąkol
Małgorzata Linkiewicz
Aleksandra Lubicka
Katarzyna Tuniewicz
Ewelina Wyszczelska
Magdalena Żebrowska
Jakub Adamczyk
Maciej Brzeziński
Bartłomiej Czajkowski
Adam Czerwiński
Michał Galikowski
Karol Hoffmann
Mariusz Jurczyk
Artur Noga
Bartosz Rożnowski

Badminton

Basketball 3x3

Team roster

Men
Maciej AdamkiewiczMariusz KonopatzkiWojciech PisarczykMichał Wojtyński

Summary

Boxing

Canoeing 

Men

Women

Qualification Legend: FA = Qualify to final (medal); FB = Qualify to final B (non-medal)

Cycling

Road

Track
Sprint

Team sprint

Keirin

Time Trial

Omnium

Madison

Pursuit

Team pursuit

Endurance

Gymnastics

Acrobatic

Artistic

Trampoline

Judo

Karate

Elimination round

Group A

Sambo

Shooting

Men

Women

Mixed team

Table tennis

Wrestling

Men's freestyle

Men's Greco-Roman

Women's Freestyle

References

Nations at the 2019 European Games
European Games
2019